US Post Office-Lumberton, also known as the Lumberton N.C. Post Office, is a historic post office building located at Lumberton, Robeson County, North Carolina.  It was designed by the Office of the Supervising Architect under James A. Wetmore and built in 1931. It is a -story, Beaux Arts style brick building with a rear addition built in 1965.  It has been renovated and houses law offices.

It was added to the National Register of Historic Places in 1985.

References

Lumberton
Beaux-Arts architecture in North Carolina
Government buildings completed in 1931
Buildings and structures in Robeson County, North Carolina
National Register of Historic Places in Robeson County, North Carolina
1931 establishments in North Carolina